Manuel of Castile (1234 – 25 December 1283,  The first Lord of Villena and Peñafiel, Cuéllar, and Escalona, was an Infante, son of Ferdinand III of Castile and his wife Elisabeth of Hohenstaufen.

Life
Born in Carrión de los Condes, the name Manuel was given to him to commemorate his maternal grandmother's roots in Imperial Byzantium. He was granted the Seigneury of Villena in 1252, created for him to govern that lordship as "apanage" (a medieval micro-state that would return to the central crown if the minor lineage ends with no successor). This lordship would grow by receiving the cities around the Vinalopó River (Elda valley, Aspe, Crevillente, Elche). He also received the Adelantamiento of the Kingdom of Murcia.

Manuel travelled to Italy in 1259 as part of the embassy sent by his father to Pope Alexander IV. Later, when his brother became king Alfonso X the Wise, served him as Alférez and Majordomo of the king.

He died at Peñafiel in 1283 and was buried in the Monastery of Uclés. His son Juan Manuel, who succeeded him in Villena and Peñafiel among the others, and became prince of Villena, was a notable medieval writer.

Manuel of Castile, as son of Ferdinand III of Castile, belonged to the royal House of Burgundy of Castile and León, but he was also the first of a new family branch, the House of Manuel of Villena.

Family
He married twice. His first wife, whom he married in 1260 in Soria was Constance of Aragon, daughter of James I of Aragon. Two children were born of this marriage:

 Alfonso Manuel (1260/1261–Montpellier, 1276), without issue.
 Violante Manuel (1265–Lisbon, 1314), lady of Elche and Medellín. Married circa 1287 to Afonso of Portugal, son of Afonso III of Portugal.

His second marriage after Constança's death was in 1274/1275 to Beatrice of Savoy, daughter of Amadeus IV of Savoy. One child was born of this marriage: 
 Juan Manuel (1282–1348), Prince of Villena, Duke of Penafiel and Lord of Escalona.

Children from other women include:
 Sancho Manuel (1283-after 1345), Lord of Infantado and Carrion. First married María Rodríguez de Castañeda, and then Inés Díaz de Toledo. With issues from both marriages.
 Enrique Manuel (born circa 1272)
 Blanca Manuel (born circa 1273)

Ancestry

References 

1234 births
1283 deaths
People from the Province of Palencia
Castilian infantes
Lords of Spain
Lords of Cuéllar
Manuel
Juan Manuel
Sons of kings